Hecatompeda is a genus of moths belonging to the family Tineidae. It contains only one species, Hecatompeda pyrocephala, which is found on the Solomon Islands.

References

Tineidae
Monotypic moth genera
Moths of Oceania
Tineidae genera
Taxa named by Edward Meyrick